Dimitrios Kyriakidis (Greek: Δημήτριος Κυριακίδης; born 24 June 1986) is a Greek professional footballer who plays as a goalkeeper for Greek club Kozani.

He previously played for PAOK, Agrotikos Asteras, Panserraikos, Levadiakos, Skoda Xanthi and Panetolikos.

Club career
In the 2007–08 season he made his first appearance for PAOK in a Greek Cup game against Thrasivoulos Filis.

At the end of the 2015–16 Superleague regular season, Kyriakidis was voted as the second best goalkeeper in the league. On 29 January 2017, he renewed his contract with Panetolikos till the summer of 2020.

International career
He was part of the Greece national under-21 football team for two years earning 3 caps. In November 2016 Kyriakidis received his first call-up to the senior Greece squad for matches against Belarus and Bosnia and Herzegovina. He was a surprise call-up by Michael Skibbe for a World Cup qualifier in March 2017, but did not play.

References

Living people
1986 births
Greek footballers
Greece under-21 international footballers
Greek expatriate footballers
Super League Greece players
Panserraikos F.C. players
Panetolikos F.C. players
Xanthi F.C. players
PAOK FC players
Levadiakos F.C. players
Kozani F.C. players
Association football goalkeepers
Footballers from Kavala